The 1964 Missouri gubernatorial election was held on November 3, 1964, and resulted in a victory for the Democratic nominee, Missouri Secretary of State Warren E. Hearnes, over the Republican candidate, Ethan A.H. Shepley.

Results

References

Gubernatorial
Missouri
1964